Ivachevo is a rural locality (a village) in Nikolskoye Rural Settlement, Kaduysky District, Vologda Oblast, Russia. The population was 31 in 2002.

Geography 
Ivachevo is located 24 km northeast of Kaduy (the district's administrative centre) by road. Nizhny Pochinok is the nearest rural locality.

References 

Rural localities in Kaduysky District